The Gergovie Monument or Memorial to Vercingetorix (French: monument commémoratif à Vercingétorix) is a monument by the Clermontois architect  built in 1900 on the eastern edge of the Gergovie plateau, a few kilometers south of Clermont-Ferrand in the French departement of Puy-de-Dôme in Auvergne. It commemorates Vercingetorix's victory over Julius Caesar on this site in 52 BC.

The monument was registered as a French ''Monument historique in March 2018 (the oppidum was registered in 2013) and in November of the same year, the monument was classified, included in a much larger classification of a major part of the Gergovie plateau.

Characteristics 

It is composed of a support base with 3 columns topped by Corinthian capitals and a Gaulish helmet in whimsical form. The base houses a crypt with a cenotaph of Vercingetorix. Three plates adorn the building.

One of the plates, above the entrance of the crypt on the west side, has the following inscription in Latin:
Translated into English:

Photo gallery

See also 

 Monument à Vercingétorix of Millet.

References
 Partial translation of the French Wikipedia article (22 October 2019 version).

External links 
 Old photos of the monument and the Gergovie  plateau on pierreseche.com

Monuments and memorials in France
Monuments historiques of Puy-de-Dôme
Buildings and structures in Puy-de-Dôme
History of Auvergne
Buildings and structures completed in 1900
1900 establishments in France
20th-century architecture in France